Madson de Souza Silva (born 26 August 1999), known as simply Madson, is a Brazilian professional footballer who plays as a forward for Portuguese club Moreirense.

Professional career
Madson made his professional debut with Corinthians in a 2-1 Campeonato Paulista loss to Ponte Preta on 30 January 2020.

On 1 September 2021, he joined Estrela da Amadora in Liga Portugal 2 on loan.

On 11 July 2022, Madson signed a four-year contract with Moreirense.

Honours
Atlético Goianiense
Campeonato Goiano: 2019

References

External links
 

1999 births
Footballers from Curitiba
Living people
Brazilian footballers
Association football forwards
Joinville Esporte Clube players
Atlético Clube Goianiense players
Sport Club Corinthians Paulista players
Fortaleza Esporte Clube players
Oeste Futebol Clube players
Santa Cruz Futebol Clube players
C.F. Estrela da Amadora players
Moreirense F.C. players
Campeonato Catarinense players
Campeonato Brasileiro Série C players
Campeonato Brasileiro Série B players
Campeonato Pernambucano players
Liga Portugal 2 players
Brazilian expatriate footballers
Expatriate footballers in Portugal
Brazilian expatriate sportspeople in Portugal